PT Waskita Karya (Persero) Tbk or Waskita Karya is an Indonesian state-owned construction company located in Cawang, Jakarta. It was the result of a January 1, 1961 nationalization of Volker Aannemings Maatschappij NV, the Indonesian branch of what would become VolkerWessels. Waskita specializes in commercial and residential building contracts.

Projects

Selected major projects, by year of completion, are:
 APT Pranoto Airport, Samarinda (2018)
 Samarinda International Airport, Samarinda (2014)
 Tsunami Museum, Tsunami Museum, Aceh (2009)
 Wisma BNI, Jakarta (1996)
 Niaga Tower, Jakarta (1992)

References

External links
Official homepage

1961 establishments in Indonesia
2012 initial public offerings
Government-owned companies of Indonesia
Construction and civil engineering companies established in 1961
Construction and civil engineering companies of Indonesia
Indonesian companies established in 1961
Companies listed on the Indonesia Stock Exchange